The Tipperary County Board of the Gaelic Athletic Association (GAA) or Tipperary GAA is one of the 32 county boards of the GAA in Ireland, and is responsible for Gaelic games in County Tipperary and the Tipperary county teams.

County Tipperary holds an honoured place in the history of the GAA as the organisation was founded in Hayes' Hotel, Thurles, on 1 November 1884.

The county football team was the second from the province of Munster both to win an All-Ireland Senior Football Championship (SFC), as well as to appear in the final, following Limerick.

The county hurling team is third in the all-time rankings for All-Ireland Senior Hurling Championship (SHC) wins, behind only Cork and Kilkenny.

History

Governance

Tipperary GAA has jurisdiction over the area that is associated with the traditional county of County Tipperary. There are 9 officers on the Board including the Cathaoirleach (Chairperson), Sean Nugent.

Officers of the Board

 President: Tommy Barrett
 Chairman: Sean Nugent
 Vice-Chairman: Michael Bourke
 Secretary: Tim Floyd
 Treasurer: Eamonn Buckley
 Public Relations Officer: Ger Ryan
 Youth Officer: John Smith
 Development Officer: Jimmy Minogue
 Coaching Officer: Nicholas Moroney

Past presidents
Four Tipperary men have served as president of the GAA. Maurice Davin is also the only man to have served two terms as president, while Seán Ryan represented Dublin from 1928 to 1932, though a native of Kilfeacle, County Tipperary. Ryan, a solicitor based in the capital, was the Association's legal advisor over a long period and played a central role in the acquisition and vesting of many club and county grounds in the GAA.
 Maurice Davin: 1884–1887
 Maurice Davin: 1888–1889 (second term)
 Seán Ryan: 1928–1932
 Séamus Gardiner: 1943–1946
 Séamus Ó Riain: 1967–1970

Colours, crest and symbols
Tipperary's team colours are royal blue and gold. Tipperary teams wear blue jerseys with a horizontal gold bar across the center along with white shorts and blue socks.

The Tipperary crest features the Rock of Cashel prominently, with two crossed hurleys and a football below. In the year '1884', when Tipperary GAA was founded, is in the centre of the crest. The original crest was the coat of arms of the Butler family, Dukes and Earls of Ormond, whose arms were adopted by local authorities within their geographic area of influence in South Leinster and East Munster — most notably the county councils of Tipperary (South Riding), Kilkenny, Carlow and Wexford, and which — among other refinements — included a central band of colours, surrounded by star-like designs. This crest was used until the late 1990s when the current crest — depicting the Rock of Cashel with two crossed hurleys and a football — was adopted.

Tipperary did not have an official jersey in the early days of the GAA. Tipperary wore the colours of the county champion club. One example was a white jersey with a green diagonal sash. This jersey design is associated with Tipperary's most historic match in either code, the Bloody Sunday senior football encounter with Dublin at Croke Park in 1920. The current jersey is blue with a gold central band. Those colours were adopted from the Boherlahan, who were county champions in 1925. Those colours were also the colours of the Tubberadora team, which later became Boherlahan. There have been several minor adjustments, especially to the sleeve and collar areas over the years, and — especially — since the introduction of sponsorship in recent decades, which necessitates the reservation of space for company logos.

Hurling

Clubs

Clubs contest the Tipperary Senior Hurling Championship. That competition's most successful club is Thurdles Sarsfields, with 36 titles.

County team

The teams of the Tipperary County Board, together with those of Kilkenny GAA and Cork GAA, lead the roll of honour in the All-Ireland Senior Hurling Championship (SHC). The Board's teams have won 28 All-Ireland SHC titles as of 2019 — the third most successful of all county boards. Three teams also have the distinction of twice winning three consecutive All-Ireland finals (1898, 1899, 1900) and (1949, 1950, 1951). The team of the 1960s is considered the greatest of all Tipperary teams. The county's fortunes declined during the latter half of the twentieth century to the extent that only seven All-Ireland SHC titles were won in the period 1966–2019; however, new systems and extensive work at underage level  brought SHC titles to Tipperary in 2010, 2016 and 2019, with old rival Kilkenny defeated in all three. As well as being victorious in four minor and three U21 All-Ireland hurling finals since 2006. For more detail on hurling history, see here.

Historically, the captain of the Tipperary senior hurling team for each season was decided by the club that won the preceding Tipperary Senior Hurling Championship. For example, Willie Ryan was the team captain for 2009, as chosen by his club Toomevara. This system, however, meant there was little consistency from year to year and often meant that the team captain was not an integral part of the team or even a first choice player (as in the Willie Ryan example). For the 2010 inter-county season the responsibility for choosing the captain of the senior team was given to the Tipperary management team, with Eoin Kelly from the Mullinahone club becoming the first captain selected under this system and Declan Fanning acting as vice-captain.

Football

Clubs

Clubs contest the Tipperary Senior Football Championship. That competition's most successful club is Fethard, with 21 titles. Clonmel Commercials comes next, with 18 titles.

County team

Tipperary has won the All-Ireland Senior Football Championship on four occasions - in 1889, 1895, 1900 and 1920. As the football championship is contested by a much larger number of teams than in hurling, success is hard won because of the high standard attained by many counties. For details on football history, see here.

Camogie

Tipperary's sudden progress to senior status (junior title in 1992, Intermediate in 1997) was followed by five All Ireland senior titles in a six-year period 1999 to 2004. Since 1949 they had previously contested seven unsuccessful All Ireland finals during Dublin's period of dominance in the game, also losing to Antrim in 1979. They won the inaugural National Camogie League (click on date for teams) in 1976 and won a second title in 2004. St Patrick's, Glengoole won the All Ireland senior club championship in 1966 and 1967. Cashel won the title in 2007 and 2009.

Under Camogie's National Development Plan 2010–2015, "Our Game, Our Passion", five new camogie clubs were to be established in the county by 2015.

Player records
Deirdre Hughes, who was played in the "full forward" position, was a member of "The Sligo Boyz".

Notable players
 Therese Brophy, All Star award winner
 Jovita Delaney, Player of the Year recipient
 Philly Fogarty, All Star award winner
 Ciara Gaynor, Player of the Year recipient
 Claire Grogan, All Star award winner
 Emily Hayden, All Ireland final star
 Liz Howard, former president of the Camogie Association
 Deirdre Hughes,"Team of the century" member 
 Suzanne Kelly, All Star award winner
 Noelle Kennedy, All Ireland final star 
 Julie Kirwan, All Star award winner
 Eimear McDonnell, Player of the Year recipient
 Una O'Dwyer, Player of the Year recipient
 Trish O'Halloran, All Star award winner
 Biddy Phillips, All Ireland final star
 Joanne Ryan, All Star award winner
 Meadhbh Stokes, All Ireland final star

Honours

Ladies' football

Player records

Honours

Handball

Tipperary have not just excelled or contested the team sports regularly, Tipp also have competed in the handball competitions. By winning Senior titles in both Senior Hardball and Softball singles, Tipp are the only county to have won an All-Ireland in every sport under the GAA except Rounders, in which there is no official Senior inter-county championship.

Hardball singles
Tipperary have won two All-Ireland Senior Hardball singles titles. These have been both won by Pat Hickey in 1966 and 1971. Tipp are currently 10th on the all time Hardball roll of honour, 11 titles behind 2nd place, 13-time winnersKilkenny and 15 times winners, 1st place Dublin

Hardball doubles
Tipperary have won eight All-Ireland Senior Hardball doubles titles. These were won in 1929, 1931, 1962, 1968, 1972, 1975, 1989 and 1995.

Softball singles
Tipperary have won three All-Ireland Senior Softball singles titles. These were won in 1948, 1950 and 1983. 
Tipp are currently 7th in the all time Softball roll of honour, 9 behind 12 times winners, 2nd place Dublin and way behind 25 times winners Kilkenny.

Softball doubles
Tipperary have won eight All-Ireland Senior Softball doubles titles. These were won in 1934, 1935, 1936, 1937, 1938, 1942, 1949 and 1950. Tipp are currently 3rd on the all time roll of honour, just 4 behind Kerry in second place with 12 and Kilkenny in first place, with 19.

40x20 singles
Tipperary have won five All-Ireland Senior 40x20 Singles titles. They were won in 1981, 1982, 1983, 1993 and 1994.

40x20 doubles
Tipperary won an All-Ireland Senior 40x20 Doubles title in 1991.

Rugby
Kilfeacle and District RFC

Stadium information
Name: Semple Stadium
Town: Thurles
Capacity: 55,500
Inauguration: 1981
Stand(s): Ardan O'Choinneain; Ardan O'Ríain
Terrace(s): Killinan End; Town End

Also known as Thurles Sportsfield, re-developed in 1981 and renamed 'Semple Stadium' after Tom Semple, one of the famous Thurles Blues. The second biggest GAA stadium in Ireland.

See also
 Tipperary Senior Football Championship
 Tipperary Senior Hurling Championship

Further reading
 Tipperary's GAA Story by Seamus J King 1935–1984,  1988.
 Tipperary's GAA Story by Philip Canon Fogarty, Tipperary Star, 1960,
 The Tipp Revival: The Keating Years by Seamus Leahy, Gill & MacMillan, 1995. 
 Babs: The Michael Keating Story by Michael Keating & Donal Kennan, Storm Books, 1996, 
 Tour Of The Tipperary Hurling Team To America in 1925, by Thomas Kenny:, London, George Roberts, 1928.
 GAA History of Cashel and Rosegreen: 1884–1984 by Seamus J King, 1985.
 Tipperary's Bord Na N-og by Seamus J King, Tipperary County Board 1991.
 A Lifetime in Hurling by Tommy Doyle and Raymond Smith 1955.
 Beyond the Tunnel by Nicky English and Vincent Hogan 1996.

References

External links

Tipperary GAA Fan site
Tipperary on Hoganstand.com
National and provincial titles won by Tipperary teams
Club championship winners and winning county captains
Tipperary GAA site
Premierview
Tipperary GAA Archives

 
Gaelic games governing bodies in Munster